The 1985–86 Quebec Nordiques season was the Nordiques seventh season in the National Hockey League. The Nordiques, led by their new captain Peter Stastny, captured their first division title since the 1976–77 season but were swept of the first round of the playoffs by the Hartford Whalers.

Offseason
The Nordiques had a pretty quiet off-season, with the only trade during the summer was acquiring John Anderson from the Toronto Maple Leafs for Brad Maxwell.  Anderson was second in Leafs scoring with 32 goals and 63 points in 1984–85.  Quebec also made a trade late in the pre-season, as the Nordiques acquired Gilbert Delorme from the St. Louis Blues for Bruce Bell.  Delorme, a stay-at-home defenseman, had two goals and 14 points in 74 games with the Blues.

The Nordiques signed free agent Tony Currie from the Edmonton Oilers, while they lost Blake Wesley, who signed with the Toronto Maple Leafs.

Regular season
The Nordiques started the season with a seven-game winning streak, however, the club fell into a slump, and had a 3-10-1 record in their next fourteen games to fall to 10-10-1.  Quebec returned to their winning ways, going unbeaten in their next eight games, and found themselves battling with the Boston Bruins and Montreal Canadiens for first place in the Adams Division.  The Nordiques fell into another slump, losing five of their next six games, however, the team then won seven in a row to improve to 25-15-2, and had a narrow two point lead over the Canadiens for first in the division.  The Nordiques and Canadiens would continue to battle for the division title for the remainder of the season, and it was the Nordiques, who finished the year 43-31-6, earning 92 points, who came out of top to win the Adams Division for the first time in team history.

Offensively, Quebec was led by Peter Stastny, who led the club with 122 points, as he scored 41 goals and added 81 assists, to finish sixth in NHL scoring.  Stastny also became the Nordiques captain in November, when the club traded away former captain Mario Marois to the Winnipeg Jets.  Michel Goulet had his fourth consecutive 50+ goal season, as he finished in fifth in the league with 53 goals.  Goulet added 51 assists to earn 104 points, breaking the 100 point barrier for the third time in four seasons.  Anton Stastny had a solid season, scoring 31 goals and 74 points, while Dale Hunter earned 28 goals and 70 points, along with a club high 265 penalty minutes.

On defense, the Nordiques were led by Robert Picard, who earned 34 points in 48 games with Quebec after being acquired in the Mario Marois trade.  Twenty-one-year-old David Shaw, in his first full NHL season, had seven goals and 26 points.

In goal, Clint Malarchuk emerged as the starter, as he won 26 games, a 3.21 GAA, and four shutouts, all team highs, in his first full NHL season.

Final standings

Schedule and results

Playoffs
The Nordiques opened the 1986 Stanley Cup playoffs with a best of five Adams Division semi-final series against the Hartford Whalers.  Despite finishing the season with a 40-36-4 record, earning 84 points, the Whalers finished in fourth place in the Adams Division.  The series opened with two games at Le Colisée, however, the Whalers stunned the Nordiques with a 3-2 overtime victory to win the first game.  Hartford then took a 2-0 series lead, as they easily defeated the favoured Nordiques 4-1 in the second game.  The series moved to the Hartford Civic Center for the third game.  The Whalers continued to dominate in the third game, destroying Quebec 9-4, to sweep the first place Nordiques out of the post-season.

Hartford Whalers 3, Quebec Nordiques 0

Player statistics

Awards and records
 First NHL All-Star team: Michel Goulet

Transactions
The Nordiques were involved in the following transactions during the 1985–86 season.

Trades

Free agents

Draft picks
Quebec's draft picks from the 1985 NHL Entry Draft which was held at the Metro Toronto Convention Centre in Toronto, Ontario.

Farm teams 
 Fredericton Express (American Hockey League)

See also
1985–86 NHL season

References

External links
 

Quebec Nordiques season, 1985-86
Quebec Nordiques seasons
Que
Adams Division champion seasons